Neoterebra juanica is a species of sea snail, a marine gastropod mollusk in the family Terebridae, the auger snails.

Description

Distribution
This marine species occurs off Puerto Rico

References

External links
 Dall, W. H.; Simpson, C. T. (1901). The Mollusca of Porto Rico. Bulletin of the United States Fish Commission. 20: 351-524, pl. 54-58
 Fedosov, A. E.; Malcolm, G.; Terryn, Y.; Gorson, J.; Modica, M. V.; Holford, M.; Puillandre, N. (2020). Phylogenetic classification of the family Terebridae (Neogastropoda: Conoidea). Journal of Molluscan Studies

Terebridae
Gastropods described in 1901